Alexandr Yuryevich Zubkov (born 10 August 1974) is a Russian retired bobsledder who has competed since 1999. Competing in four Winter Olympics, he won two medals with a silver in 2006 (four-man) and a bronze in 2010 (two-man). On 24 November 2017, he was found guilty of doping offences and stripped of his medals from the 2014 Winter Olympics.

Career 
Zubkov also won four medals at the FIBT World Championships with two silvers (Four-man: 2005, 2008) and two bronzes (Two-man: 2008, Four-man: 2003). He won the Bobsleigh World Cup in the four-man event three times as well (2004–5, 2005–6, 2008–9).

Prior to competing in bobsleigh, he competed in luge. Zubkov finished 20th in the men's singles event at the 1998 Winter Olympics in Nagano.

2014 Winter Olympics 
In 2014 Sochi Winter Olympics, he was the flag bearer of Russia for the Opening Ceremony. Zubkov won Gold in both Two-Man and Four-Man Bobsleigh.

In the 2014 Sochi Olympics, Zubkov was coached by a former rival, Canadian Pierre Lueders. Zubkov also paid a fee to borrow personal skids from the 2011 World Champion, Germany's Manuel Machata. Machata bought the skids for €29,000 in Switzerland, and had not qualified for the 2014 Winter Olympics. The 2014 Olympics saw Germany failing to win a bobsleigh medal at an Olympics for the first time since Innsbruck 1964. Machata did not inform German Bobsleigh Luge and Skeleton Federation of this loan and received a one-year competitive ban and fine of €5,000 (250,000 rubles) from the German Federation.

After the 2014 Olympics, Zubkov received the Order "For Merit to the Fatherland" award 4th class with Russian President Vladimir Putin handing the state awards.

In October 2014 Zubkov announced his retirement from the sport due to a long-term injury which prevented him from competing at the start of the 2014–15 season.

In May 2016, Zubkov was named in a New York Times investigation of the state-sponsored steroid program in Russia. On 24 November 2017, he was found guilty of doping offenses by the International Olympic Committee and stripped of his medals from the 2014 Winter Olympics. On 1 February 2018, following a Russian appeal, the CAS removed the sanctions from Alexey Negodaylo and Dmitry Trunenkov in bobsleigh, but upheld them on their teammates Alexandr Zubkov and Alexey Voyevoda. In 2018, Zubkov appealed this decision in the Moscow City Court, which decided not to recognise the CAS decision in Russia. Despite no longer being an Olympic gold medallist, the Russian government has continued to classify him as an Olympic champion and pay him the lifetime Presidential stipend which is awarded to all Olympics medal winners.

Personal life
His daughter, Elisaveta Zubkova, is a Russian skeleton slider.

References

External links

 Bobsleigh four-man Olympic medalists for 1924, 1932–56, and since 1964
 Bobsleigh two-man world championship medalists since 1931
 Bobsleigh four-man world championship medalists since 1930
 
 List of combined men's bobsleigh World Cup champions: 1985–2007
 List of four-man bobsleigh World Cup champions since 1985
 List of two-man bobsleigh World Cup champions since 1985

1974 births
Living people
Russian male bobsledders
Russian male lugers
Bobsledders at the 2002 Winter Olympics
Bobsledders at the 2006 Winter Olympics
Bobsledders at the 2010 Winter Olympics
Bobsledders at the 2014 Winter Olympics
Lugers at the 1998 Winter Olympics
Olympic bobsledders of Russia
Olympic lugers of Russia
Olympic silver medalists for Russia
Olympic bronze medalists for Russia
People from Bratsk
Olympic medalists in bobsleigh
Medalists at the 2010 Winter Olympics
Medalists at the 2006 Winter Olympics
Russian sportspeople in doping cases
Doping cases in bobsleigh
Competitors stripped of Winter Olympics medals
Sportspeople from Irkutsk Oblast